Hurst Reservoir is a former, now disused, reservoir near Glossop, north Derbyshire.

History
In 1837, 50 local millowners and gentlemen, known as the "Glossop Commissioners", obtained an Act of Parliament to construct the Glossop Reservoirs. Hurst Reservoir was on the Hurst Brook and Mossy Lea Reservoir was to take water from the Shelf Brook. Only the Hurst Reservoir was constructed before the money ran out. Mossy Lea Reservoir was later constructed privately by the Duke of Norfolk. His engineer and surveyor was John Frederick Bateman. The reservoir was taken over in 1929 by the Glossop Corporation Waterworks. This became part of the Manchester Corporation Waterworks in 1959.

Decommissioning
Swineshaw Reservoir, Hurst Reservoir, and Mossy Lea Reservoir are no longer in service. In 2013, the Hurst Reservoir embankment was removed and the silt that had built up over the previous 175 years was dispersed within the Hurst valley. The reservoir was decommissioned because it had not been used for drinking water for 25 years and maintenance of the dam could no longer be justified. Following the removal of the embankment, a small pond (fire break) was retained to benefit wildlife, with the stream being returned to its original course. The former reservoir is next to Glossop & District Golf Club.

See also
List of reservoirs and dams in the United Kingdom

References 

Reservoirs of the Peak District
Drinking water reservoirs in England
Reservoirs in Derbyshire